The World Wide Web Foundation, also known as the Web Foundation, is a US-based international nonprofit organization advocating for a free and open web for everyone. It was cofounded by Tim Berners-Lee, the inventor of the World Wide Web, and Rosemary Leith. Announced in September 2008 in Washington, D.C., the Web Foundation launched operations in November 2009 at the Internet Governance Forum.

The Web Foundation is focused on increasing global access to the World Wide Web while ensuring the web is a safe and empowering tool that people can use freely and fully to improve their lives. One of its former board members was Gordon Brown, former prime minister of the United Kingdom.

Mission 
The Web Foundation's mission is to advance the open web as a public good and a basic right. It seeks to achieve digital equality; a world where everyone has the same rights and opportunities online.

In an open letter published in March 2018, Web Foundation founder Berners-Lee called for action to connect the 50% of the world still not online and to ensure they find a web worth connecting to.

In 2019, Web Foundation launched the initiative Contract for the Web to attempt to address issues of political manipulation, fake news, privacy violations, and other malign forces on the internet.

Organization 
Headquartered in Washington, D.C., the Web Foundation works across 70 countries, including work through partner organizations. Its team of around 30 employees works from three main hubs in Jakarta, London and Washington, D.C.

It is also the host organization for the Alliance for Affordable Internet, a global coalition of organizations working to reduce the costs of broadband and increase access to the internet.

Research 
The Web Foundation produces a number of research products including the Open Data Barometer, the Affordability Report, the Web Index and other studies and reports.

Campaigning 
In November 2018, the Web Foundation launched the #ForTheWeb campaign, unveiled by founder Berners-Lee at the Web Summit tech conference in Lisbon, Portugal. The campaign calls on governments, companies and citizens to commit to defending a free and open web by signing up to a Contract for the Web.

The Contract for the Web was published as a set of initial high level principles that was built into a full contract published 25 November 2019. These principles received backing from governments including Germany and France, companies such as Google, Facebook and Cloudflare, as well as a number of civil society organizations.

See also
 History of the World Wide Web
 World Wide Web Consortium

References

External links
 World Wide Web Foundation

World Wide Web
Organizations established in 2009
International organizations based in the United States
Information and communication technologies for development
Non-profit organizations based in Washington, D.C.